{{DISPLAYTITLE:C27H31O15}}
The molecular formula C27H31O15+ (molar mass: 595.53 g/mol, exact mass: 595.1663 u) may refer to:

 Antirrhinin
 Pelargonin

Molecular formulas